Bratin Dol is a village in the municipality of Bitola, North Macedonia.

Demographics
Bratin Dol is attested in the Ottoman defter of 1467/68 as a village in the vilayet of Manastir. A part of the inhabitants  attested bore typical Albanian anthroponyms, such as  Gjergj.

The Albanian population of Bratin Dol are Tosks, a subgroup of southern Albanians. In statistics gathered  in 1900, the village of Bratin Dol was inhabited by 150 Albanian Muslims and 100 Macedonian Christians. According to the 2002 census, the village had a total of 185 inhabitants. Ethnic groups in the village include:

Macedonians 146
 Albanians 33
 Vlachs 3
 Others 3

References

External links

Villages in Bitola Municipality
Albanian communities in North Macedonia